Citharinus latus is a species of lutefish from tropical Africa.

Distribution
Found in Africa: where it is known from Senegal, Casamance, Niger, Volta, the Chad basin and certain coastal rivers in Guinéa-Bissau, Togo and Benin. . Also has been found in the Nile and Lake Mobutu Sese Seko (Lake Albert).

Size
The fish can get as large as 84.0 cm.

References

Gosse, J.-P., 1990. Citharinidae. p. 261-268. In C. Lévêque, D. Paugy and G.G. Teugels (eds.) Faune des poissons d'eaux douces et saumâtres de l'Afrique de l'Ouest. Tome I. Coll. Faune Tropicale n° XXVIII. Musée Royal de l'Afrique Centrale, Tervuren and O.R.S.T.O.M., Paris, 384 p.

Characiformes
Fish of Africa
Taxa named by Johannes Peter Müller
Taxa named by Franz Hermann Troschel
Fish described in 1844